Brenda López de Arrarás (born April 25, 1971) is a Puerto Rican politician. She was a member of the Puerto Rico Chamber of Representatives from 2009 until 2021, and is affiliated to the Popular Democratic Party (PPD) and served as the party's vice president. She was the first woman, who reached that position, unanimously elected.

Early years and studies

Brenda López was born on April 25, 1971, in Arecibo, but was raised in Utuado. Her father was a former member of the Puerto Rico House of Representatives for District 22. She completed her elementary and high school studies in Utuado. López then completed a bachelor's degree in Political Science from the University of Puerto Rico at Río Piedras graduating in 1993. After completing her bachelor's degree school, López de Arrarás entered the Pontificia Universidad Católica de Ponce and reached Juris Doctor degree in 1996.

Political life

In 2007, López decided to run for office as a Representative. At the PPD primaries next year, she was the third candidate with most votes for Representative At-large. She was then elected at the 2008 general elections. She served as the party's Ranking Minority member in the Commissions of Education, Community Organizations, Agriculture, and others.

López was re-elected to a second term on the 2012 General Elections and a third term in the 2016 General Election. She served as the Chairwoman of the Commissions on Women Issues & Equality and Education, Arts & Culture from 2013 to 2016.

Personal life

Brenda López is married to fellow politician José Enrique Arrarás. They have two children together named Enrique Antonio Arraras and Isabel Celste Arraras .

References

External links
Brenda López de Arrarás on CamaraDeRepresentantes.org

1971 births
21st-century American women politicians
21st-century American politicians
Living people
People from Arecibo, Puerto Rico
People from Utuado, Puerto Rico
Popular Democratic Party members of the House of Representatives of Puerto Rico
Puerto Rican women in politics
University of Puerto Rico alumni